Elisa Christy (born Elisa Crochet Asperó, September 1917, in Mexico City) was a cast actress and dancer.

Career
Elisa Christy was involved in several movies, including "La Valentina" in 1938, "                                                                                                                                                                                                               Juntos, pero no revueltos" (which was also known as "Together But Not Mixed") in 1939, and "La Viuda Celosa" in 1946.

Personal life and Death
Elisa Christy is the daughter of the actress Elisa Asperó and the great Spanish actor Julio Villarreal (Julio Crochet).

Christy married Jorge Negrete, a Mexican musician and actor.  She gave birth to their only child, Diana Negrete. They divorced in 1942, after which Christy remarried. She died May 26, 2018, at the age of 100.

Selected filmography
 Lola Casanova (1949)

References

External links

1917 births
2018 deaths
Actresses from Mexico City
20th-century Mexican actresses
Mexican people of Spanish descent
Mexican film actresses